The Packard 300 is an automobile built and sold by the Packard Motor Car Company of Detroit, Michigan for model years 1951 and 1952.  The 300 represented the upper mid-range Packard model and provided better appointments than the Packard 200 or the Packard 250 models.  The premier Packard offered during these years was the Packard Patrician 400.

For both model years the 300 model was built as a four-door sedan only and was mounted on Packard's  wheelbase. The car included the basic trim appointments found in the 200 and 200 Deluxe model lines and included tinted windows, a robe rail for backseat passengers and striped interior fabrics. Exterior trim included full wheel covers as well as Packard's graceful pelican hood ornament. The 300 also received a wrap around rear window which it shared with the Patrician models.

Power for the car in both years came from Packard's venerable Super Eight engine, the  "Thunderbolt" inline eight which was shared with the 250 line.  A three-speed manual shift was standard while Packard's Ultramatic automatic transmission was offered as optional equipment.

In 1953 the 300 was renamed the Packard Cavalier as Packard moved away from its strict numeric model naming structure.  A total of 22,309 Packard 300s were built in the model's two years on the market with 1951's total of 15,309 representing the high sales mark for the 300 model.

Sources

 
 

300
Rear-wheel-drive vehicles
Cars introduced in 1951